The Costume Society is a British organisation formed in 1965 to promote the study and preservation of historic and contemporary dress. It publishes a scholarly journal, Costume, as well as one-off publications; and organises events and study days.

History
The Costume Society was formed in 1965, arising from a developing interest in the history of fashion and a desire on the part of its founders to foster serious research in an area which previously had been the domain of the amateur collector. The immediate genesis of the organisation was a meeting held at the Victoria and Albert Museum on 13 October 1964.

Its first chairman was Charles Harvard Gibbs-Smith, Keeper of the Department of Public Relations at the Victoria and Albert Museum (V&A), followed by Donald Beeson King, art historian and keeper of textiles at the V&A; Roy Strong, V&A director, Anne Buck, curator of the Gallery of Costume at Platt Hall in Manchester, and June Swann, Keeper of the Boot and Shoe Collection at the Northampton Museum and Art Gallery. The most recent chairman (2014-2018) was Deirdre Murphy, senior curator at Kensington Palace.

Activities
Since 1967, the society, through Edinburgh University Press publishes its journal, Costume twice per year. Costume is listed in the Arts and Humanities Citation Index of the Institute for Scientific Information. It organises regular conferences, study days and museum visits, and administers a number of conservation awards and bursaries.

Student awards and conservation grants are aimed at students of the history and theory of dress, costume design and production as well as other related fields. They also make awards to museums and other institutions to cover the costs of conservation of objects.

References

External links
Inflatable Costumes

Organisations based in the United Kingdom
Organizations established in 1965
Clothing-related organizations
History of fashion